Lewis Jeffrey Feldman (born October 10, 1945) is a professor of plant biology at the University of California, Berkeley, Director of the University of California Botanical Garden and previously Associate Dean for Academic Affairs in the College of Natural Resources. He is in the Department of Plant and Microbial Biology. Feldman has taught at Berkeley since 1978. He received Berkeley's Distinguished Teaching Award in 1996. Feldman's research focuses on regulation of development in meristems/stem cells, root gravitropism, and redox regulation of plant development.

After graduating in 1963 from Sunset High School in Hayward, California, Feldman attended the University of California, Davis, earning a B.S. in 1967, then an M.S., both in Botany. He received a Ph.D. in Biology from Harvard University in 1975.

Feldman is a fellow of the California Academy of Sciences.

Honors and awards
 The Jeanette Siron Pelton Award - 1980
 CNR Teaching Award - College of Natural Resources - 1992
 Distinguished Teaching Award - University of California, Berkeley - 1996
 Outstanding Mentorship of Graduate Student Instructors - 1999

Selected research papers

Other writings
  (An abstract for a presentation)

Notes

References
  Feldman is quoted extensively in this article.

External links

 Feldman's profile on his department's website
 Plant & Microbial Biology Department, UC Berkeley
 College of Natural Resources, UC Berkeley

Online videos
  Lectures from UC Berkeley's Biology 1B course, Spring 2012. Most of these videos are about 50 minutes long.

21st-century American botanists
1945 births
Living people
University of California, Berkeley College of Natural Resources faculty
People associated with the California Academy of Sciences
University of California, Davis alumni
Harvard Graduate School of Arts and Sciences alumni
Scientists from the San Francisco Bay Area
20th-century American scientists